Lohr or Löhr may refer to:

Geography
Lohr am Main, town in the Main-Spessart county, Bavaria, Germany
Lohr, Bas-Rhin, village and commune in the Bas-Rhin département, France
Lohr (river), river of Hesse and Bavaria, Germany

People
Lohr (surname)
Löhr (surname)

Other
Lohr Industrie, French manufacturer

See also
 Loehr (surname)
 Loher (disambiguation)